When Love Met Destruction is the second EP by American metalcore band Motionless in White. It was released on February 17, 2009, through Tragic Hero Records.

Background
When Love Met Destruction was recorded in the group's hometown after a year of releasing their debut EP The Whorror. Although When Love Met Destruction is an EP as its releasing through Tragic Hero, it was initially a full-length album that was released through Masquerade Recordings, where it was recorded in 2008 with limited production values. The band would sell the album on the 2008 Vans Warped Tour. There are only 1,000 copies in existence of the full-length, 11-track album. After catching the attention of larger label, Tragic Hero Records, Motionless in White then  made the decision to re-record six of the album's eleven tracks, which then came to be the EP version of When Love Met Destruction and the form that the album is more widely known in.

The song "Ghost in the Mirror" was released along with a music video, a "uncensored" version of the video surfaced on the internet, the video contains a man in hospital with a nurse covered in blood with clips found in the "censored" version in between; whether the band had any involvement with the uncensored music video is unknown.

Some songs from the original album version of When Love Met Destruction were later remade into new songs. Such as how "Bananamontana" was remade into the song "City Lights" and the chorus of "When Love Met Destruction" was remade and featured as the chorus of their song "Creatures". Both "City Lights" and "Creatures", along with a re-recording of "We Only Come Out at Night", were featured on the band's 2010 full-length album, Creatures.

Track listing
All songs written by Chris "Motionless" Cerulli.

Personnel
Motionless in White
 Chris "Motionless" Cerulli – lead vocals, additional guitar
 Ryan Sitkowski – lead guitar
 Thomas "TJ" Bell – rhythm guitar, co-lead vocals
 Frank Polumbo – bass
 Josh Balz – keyboards, backing vocals
 Angelo Parente – drums

Additional musicians
 Mike Costanza – lead guitar (limited edition)

Additional personnel
 Brian J. Anthony and Dave Yukon – audio engineering
 Tony Lee Bonomo – photography

Trivia
The song "Ghost in the Mirror" has references to the American stop-motion-animated musical dark fantasy film, Corpse Bride.

References

2009 EPs
Tragic Hero Records albums
Motionless in White albums
2008 albums